Will may refer to:

Common meanings
 Will and testament, instructions for the disposition of one's property after death
 Will (philosophy), or willpower
 Will (sociology)
 Will, volition (psychology)
 Will, a modal verb - see Shall and will

People and fictional characters
 Will (comics) (1927–2000), a comic strip artist
 Will (given name), a list of people and fictional characters named Will or Wil
 Will (surname)
 Will (Brazilian footballer) (born 1973)
 Will (singer), Italian singer-songwriter

Arts, entertainment, and media

Films
 Will: G. Gordon Liddy, a 1982 TV film
 Will (1981 film), an American drama
 Will (2011 film), a British sports drama
 Bandslam, a 2008 film with the working title Will

Literature
 Will (novel), by Christopher Rush
 Will, an autobiography by G. Gordon Liddy

Music
 Will (band), a Canadian electronic music act
 Will (Julianna Barwick album), a 2016 album by Julianna Barwick
 Will (Leo O'Kelly album), a 2011 album by Leo O'Kelly
Will, a 1999 album by Akina Nakamori
 "Will" (Ayumi Hamasaki song), 2005
 "Will" (Mika Nakashima song), 2002
 "Will" (Joyner Lucas song), 2020

Radio
 WILL (AM), an NPR member station licensed to Urbana, Illinois, United States
 WILL-FM, an NPR member station licensed to Urbana, Illinois, United States
 WRMR (FM), a radio station licensed to Jacksonville, North Carolina, United States, which called itself "Will FM" from 2006 to 2008
 WYHW, a radio station licensed to Wilmington, North Carolina, which called itself "Will FM" from 2008 to 2009

Other uses in arts, entertainment, and media
 Will (TV series), a TV series on the life of William Shakespeare
 Will: The Death Trap II, a video game
 WILL-TV, a PBS member station licensed to Urbana, Illinois, United States

Law
 Wisconsin Institute for Law and Liberty, a conservative law firm
 Women in Law and Litigation ("WILL"), in India

Ships
 , a slave ship
 , a 1925 Thames sailing barge

Other uses
 Will County, Illinois, United States
 WiLL, a brand used by a small group of Japanese companies
 Weakside linebacker, or will, in gridiron football

See also
 
 Bill (disambiguation)
 The Will (disambiguation)
 William (disambiguation)
 Willing (disambiguation)
 Wills (disambiguation)